Kondoor is a village in Marrigudam mandal in Nalgonda district, Telangana, India. The village is about 60 km from Hyderabad.

References

Villages in Nalgonda district